Corkran is a surname. Notable people with the surname include: 

Alice Corkran (1843–1916), Irish author of children's fiction and editor of children's magazines
Charles Corkran (1872–1939), British Army general
Peter Corkran (born 1948), Australian rules footballer

See also
Corcoran (surname)